Mike Nguyen Le (also credited as Mike Le) is a Vietnamese American screenwriter, producer, and film director.

Screenwriting
Le wrote and co-executive produced the feature horror film Dark Summer (2014), directed by Paul Solet and starring Keir Gilchrist, Stella Maeve, Maestro Harrell, Grace Phipps, and Peter Stormare. The film is "a stylized modern ghost story" and "follows the tale of a 17-year-old on house arrest for the summer. When his mother is away on business, a horrifying incident occurs, followed by an even more terrifying presence in the house."

Le has also written the film "Amnesiac" directed by Michael Polish and starring Kate Bosworth and Wes Bentley. 
 
Le co-wrote the screenplay to the thriller war film, W.M.D., directed by Richard Halpern and starring Tom Kiesche, John Posey and Leila Birch.

Le wrote the screenplay for the 2018 film Patient Zero starring Matt Smith, Natalie Dormer and Stanley Tucci.

Le is a writer on the second season of BMF (TV series).

Directing, Producing & Editing
Le has directed and executive produced over 18 episodes of the web series K-Town. Le has also directed and executive produced over 8 episodes of the "spin-off" series to K-Town, a web series focusing on import car models entitled Roll Models.

Le was brought onto the second season of BMF (TV series) as Supervising Producer.

Comic Book Writing
Le co-wrote, with Robert Kirkman, creator of The Walking Dead comic book, the bestselling comic book series Mayhem! for Image Comics.

References

External links

Mike Le on Twitter
Screen Gems Wins Bidding War for Mike Le’s Zombie Script ‘Patient Zero’
Cannes: Paul Solet to Direct Supernatural Horror Film 'Dark Summer'
Jeff Yang, WSJ Speakeasy, Tough Times for Tiger Moms as Asian-America Meets ‘Jersey Shore’

Living people
Vietnamese film directors
American film directors of Vietnamese descent
Film directors from California
Year of birth missing (living people)
State College of Florida, Manatee–Sarasota alumni